The following is a list of countries by automotive component exports. Data is for 2016, in billions of United States dollars, as reported by The Observatory of Economic Complexity. Currently the top 10 countries are listed.

References
atlas.media.mit.edu - Observatory of Economic complexity - Countries that export Vehicle Parts (2016)

Automotive component